Epidemiology and Psychiatric Sciences is a quarterly peer-reviewed scientific journal covering psychiatry and epidemiology. It was established in 1992 as Epidemiologia e Psichiatria Sociale, obtaining its current name in 2011. The founding editor-in-chief was Michele Tansella, and the current one is Corrado Barbui (University of Verona). According to the Journal Citation Reports, the journal has a 2020 impact factor of 6.892, ranking it 18th out of 156 journals in the category "Psychiatry".

References

External links

Cambridge University Press academic journals
Publications established in 1992
Quarterly journals
English-language journals
Psychiatry journals
Epidemiology journals